This was a new event in 2013. Wang Yafan won the inaugural title, defeating Misa Eguchi in the final, 6–2, 6–0.

Seeds

Main draw

Finals

Top half

Bottom half

References 
 Main draw

Nature's Way Sydney Tennis International - Women's Singles
2013 Women's Singles
Womens sin